The sopranissimo saxophone (also known as the piccolo or soprillo saxophone) is the smallest member of the saxophone family. It is pitched in B, one octave above the soprano saxophone. The keywork only extends to a written E6 (sounding D7), rather than F, F, or sometimes G, like most saxophones, and the upper octave key has to be placed on the mouthpiece.

The extremely small mouthpiece requires a small and focused embouchure, making the soprillo difficult to play, particularly in its upper register. There is very little market demand for soprillos, reducing the economy of scale and making the soprillo more expensive than more common saxophones like the alto or tenor.

As of 2015, soprillos were being manufactured by the German instrument maker Benedikt Eppelsheim, and the retail price is approximately US$3,400.

See also
Sopranino saxophone
Soprano saxophone
Tubax

References

External links
 Nigel Wood Music – information about the soprillo and the National Saxophone Choir of Great Britain
 Benedikt Eppelsheim's Soprillo page
 Strange saxes page at the web site of Jay C. Easton; includes pictures and sound clips of his soprillo.

Listening
Soprillo MP3s from Benedikt Eppelsheim site
Soprillogy: CD dedicated to the soprillo.

Saxophones

B-flat instruments